Viktoryia Alehauna Kolb (born 26 October 1993) is a Belarusian athlete specialising in the shot put. She won the gold medal at the 2015 European U23 Championships.

Her personal bests in the event are 18.16 metres outdoors (Brest 2018) and 17.50 metres indoors (Mogilyov 2017).

International competitions

References

1993 births
Living people
Belarusian female shot putters
People from Baranavichy
Athletes (track and field) at the 2010 Summer Youth Olympics
Sportspeople from Brest Region